Shaaban Ibrahim is an Egyptian Paralympic powerlifter. He represented Egypt at the Summer Paralympics three times: in 2008, 2012 and 2016. He won a bronze medal on each occasion; he won bronze in the men's 60 kg event in 2008, in the men's 67.5 kg event in 2012 and in the men's 65 kg event in 2016.

At the 2014 Powerlifting World Championships held in Dubai, United Arab Emirates, he won the bronze medal in the men's 65 kg event. In 2021, he won the bronze medal in the men's 72 kg event at the World Para Powerlifting Championships held in Tbilisi, Georgia.

References

External links 
 

Living people
Year of birth missing (living people)
Place of birth missing (living people)
Powerlifters at the 2008 Summer Paralympics
Powerlifters at the 2012 Summer Paralympics
Powerlifters at the 2016 Summer Paralympics
Medalists at the 2008 Summer Paralympics
Medalists at the 2012 Summer Paralympics
Medalists at the 2016 Summer Paralympics
Paralympic medalists in powerlifting
Paralympic bronze medalists for Egypt
Egyptian male weightlifters
Paralympic powerlifters of Egypt
20th-century Egyptian people
21st-century Egyptian people